Nicolae Nere (born Bucharest, 6 December 1981) is a Romanian rugby union player. He plays as a prop.

As of March 28, 2016, he plays for Steaua București, in the SuperLiga.

He previously played for Farul Constanța and CSM București and also for Bucharest Wolves in the Amlin Challenge Cup.

He gathered 18 caps for Romania, from 2006 to 2011, scoring 1 try, 5 points on aggregate. He was called for the 2011 Rugby World Cup, playing in a single game but without scoring. He has been absent from the National Team since then.

References

External links

1981 births
Living people
Romanian rugby union players
Rugby union props
CSA Steaua București (rugby union) players
București Wolves players
RCJ Farul Constanța players
CSM București (rugby union) players
Rugby union players from Bucharest
Romania international rugby union players